Acraea masaris is a butterfly in the family Nymphalidae. It is found on the Comoros.

Subspecies
Acraea masaris masaris (Comoros)
Acraea masaris jodina Pierre, 1992 (Comoros)

Similar species
Acraea esebria

Taxonomy
It is a member of the Acraea jodutta species group -  but see also Pierre & Bernaud, 2014

References

External links

Die Gross-Schmetterlinge der Erde 13: Die Afrikanischen Tagfalter. Plate XIII 57 c

Butterflies described in 1893
masaris
Endemic fauna of the Comoros